Age of Aquarius is the second studio album by the Finnish power metal band Revolution Renaissance. It is the first album featuring singer Gus Monsanto, drummer Bruno Agra, bassist Justin Biggs and keyboardist Mike Khalilov. It was released on 25 March 2009 in South-East Asia by JVC/Victor Entertainment and on 23 March 2009 in the rest of the world by Scarlet Records. A promotional video clip for the title track was recorded and produced in late 2008. The band released the song"Age of Aquarius" and "Ghost of Fallen Grace" as a free, high-quality mp3 download on their website.

Track listing 
All tracks written by Tolkki, Agra and Monsanto.

 "Age of Aquarius" – 4:38
 "Sins of My Beloved" – 5:28
 "Ixion's Wheel" – 4:25
 "Behind the Mask" – 2:54
 "Ghost of Fallen Grace" – 4:45
 "Heart of All" – 6:39
 "So She Wears Black" – 7:11
 "Kyrie Eleison" – 6:41
 "Into the Future" – 5:00
 "So She Wears Black" (Guitar Mix) – 7:20 [Japanese Bonus Track]

Personnel 
 Timo Tolkki – guitars
 Gus Monsanto – vocals
 Justin Biggs – bass
 Bruno Agra – drums, orchestral arrangements
 Mike Khalilov – keyboards
 Magdalena Lee – classical vocals
 Produced: Tolkki, Lehtiniemi
 Engineered: Santtu Lehtiniemi
 Mixed by Timo Tolkki

References

2009 albums
Revolution Renaissance albums
Scarlet Records albums